Joel "Jack" Nagle (1917  – August 15, 1990) was the head coach of the Marquette University men's basketball team from 1953 to 1958.

Biography 
Born in Chicago, Illinois, Nagle was educated at Shorewood High School and at Marquette, where he lettered in both the 1938–39 and 1939–40 seasons, as a reserve guard on the team.

Following graduation, Nagle served in the United States Army Air Corps (USAAC) from 1940–44.  After leaving the military, Nagle was named an assistant coach at Marquette under his former coach, Bill Chandler, and later under Fred "Tex" Winter.  Nagle was named head coach of the Warriors in 1953 after Winter left to return to Kansas State as that school's head coach.

Nagle was also instrumental in the renaming of the team from the Marquette Hilltoppers to the Warriors.

The first Marquette men's basketball team to earn a trip to the NCAA Tournament was the 1954–55 team, in Nagle's second year as head coach.  The team had its first ever 20-win season, compiling a 24–3 record.  The team reached as high as No. 4 in the AP Poll before finishing the season ranked No. 8.  Marquette beat Miami (Ohio) University in the first round of the tournament 90–79 and then beat No. 2 Kentucky, 79–71 in the second round. Marquette then lost to No. 5 Iowa in the Elite Eight, 86–81.

Nagle's record over five seasons at Marquette was 69–55 (55.6%).

In 1958, Nagle left the college coaching ranks and took a position at Whitefish Bay High School in suburban Milwaukee, Wisconsin,  and coaching the boys' varsity basketball team from 1962–1972 and the girls' varsity team from 1973–1989.  Both his boys and girls teams made appearances in the Wisconsin state high school basketball tournament.  Nagle is the only coach in American basketball history to coach teams in the NCAA tournament and both a boys and girls state high school tournament.

In the 1980s, Nagle was a scout for the Cleveland Cavaliers and later the Dallas Mavericks.

He was a charter member of the Wisconsin High School Basketball Association Hall of Fame and was voted Wisconsin High School Coach of the Year 10 times.  Nagle also served as commissioner of the Continental Basketball Association.

Nagle was one of the early proponents of summer basketball camps to teach skills, beginning day camps in the mid-1960s. In 1986, he authored a popular coaching book titled Power Pattern Offenses for Winning Basketball.

He died in 1990 in Shorewood, Wisconsin.

Nagle's eldest son, Chuck, was a three-year starter at the University of Wisconsin–Madison (67/68–69/70).

Head coaching record

Books authored 
Jack Nagle, Power Pattern Offenses for Winning Basketball, West Nyack, NY: Parker Publishing, 1986

References

External links
Biography of Jack Nagle, Whitefish Bay High School Athletic Hall of Fame, Inaugural Class 2011-2012

1917 births
1990 deaths
United States Army personnel of World War II
American men's basketball coaches
American men's basketball players
Basketball coaches from Illinois
Basketball players from Illinois
Marquette Golden Eagles men's basketball coaches
Marquette Golden Eagles men's basketball players
People from Shorewood, Wisconsin
United States Army Air Forces soldiers